Artemis Fowl is a series of novels by Eoin Colfer.

Artemis Fowl may also refer to:

 Artemis Fowl (novel), the first book in the series
 Artemis Fowl II, main character of the series
 Artemis Fowl I, father of Artemis Fowl II
 Artemis Fowl (film), a sci-fi film adaptation of the first book
 Artemis Fowl: The Graphic Novel, a graphic novel adaptation of the first book